Omoide Breaker (想い出ブレイカー / Memory Breaker) is the twenty-fourth single by the Japanese hip-hop group Lead, released on September 17, 2014. The single peaked on the Oricon charts at #4 and remained on the charts for four weeks.

The single was released as a standard CD, along with three limited edition, two of which were CD+DVD combos, each carrying different content. While every edition contained the b-side "Summer Love Story", each edition harbored a bonus track. The CD+DVD editions not only contained differing content on the CD portions, but also harbored different content on the DVDs.

Information
Omoide Breaker (想い出ブレイカー / Memory Breaker) is the twenty-fourth single by the Japanese hip-hop group Lead, released in September 2014 and was their second single of the year, their previous being Sakura in February. The single continued their string of top five charting singles, which began with Wanna Be With You in March 2012, taking the #4 position for the weekly ranking on the Oricon Singles Charts, and remained on the charts for four consecutive weeks.

The single was released in four different editions; a standard CD, two limited edition CD+DVD combo packs, and a limited CD only edition. The standard CD contained the title track, the coupling track "Summer Love Story" - which was available on every edition - and the songs' corresponding instrumentals. The type A CD+DVD edition harbored the two tracks, the bonus track "Kimi to Aruku Mirai" (君と歩く未来 / Walking to the Future With You) and the corresponding instrumentals. The DVD portion housed the music video for "Omoide Breaker" and the making video off-shot. The type B CD+DVD edition contained the bonus track "Fairy tale" on the CD, while housing a dance version of "Omoide Breaker" on the DVD, along with an interview with the members of Lead. The limited CD only versions contained the bonus track "Senkou Hanabi" (線香花火 / Sparkler), along with all the songs' corresponding instrumentals.

"Omoide Breaker" was written and composed by musical composer Satori Shiraishi, while the music was performed by Nao Harada. Satori is best known for his works with the Japanese female rock band Cyntia. "Summer Love Story" was written and composed by AnDisM, who had composed most of the music for their previous single Sakura. The track "Fairy tale" was written and composed by Lead's very own Akira Kagimoto. The lyrics were written by J-Bright with Lead's Shinya Tanuichi writing the rap portion. The track "Senkou Hanabi" was composed by Akiyuki Tateyama and performed by Inoue Tomonori from the Japanese band TAYNTON. The lyrics were written by Lead's Keita Furuya, who became the lead vocalist after the departure of Hiroki Nakadoi.

Packaging
Omoide Breaker was released in four separate editions: a standard CD, two limited edition CD+DVD combo packs, and a limited CD only edition.

The standard CD contained the title track "Omoide Breaker", the coupling track "Summer Love Story" - which was available on every edition - and the corresponding instrumentals. The type A CD+DVD edition harbored the two tracks, the bonus track "Kimi to Aruku Mirai" and the corresponding instrumentals. The DVD portion housed the music video for "Omoide Breaker" and the making video off-shot.

The type B CD+DVD edition contained the bonus track "Fairy tale" on the CD, while housing a dance version of "Omoide Breaker" on the DVD, along with an interview with the members of Lead. The limited CD only versions contained the bonus track "Senkou Hanabi" (線香花火 / Sparkler), along with all the songs' corresponding instrumentals. Senkou hanabi is a type of Japanese firework, which is typically used for celebrations.

Track listing

Charts

References

External links
Lead Official Site

2014 singles
2014 songs
Lead (band) songs
Pony Canyon singles
Japanese-language songs